Neos Kosmos is an interchange station between Athens Metro Line 2 and the Athens Tram.

References

Athens Metro stations
Athens Tram stops
Railway stations opened in 2000
2000 establishments in Greece